One human poll made up the 2017 National Association of Intercollegiate Athletics (NAIA) football rankings, sometimes called the NAIA Coaches' Poll or the football ratings.  When the regular season was complete, the NAIA conducted a playoff to determine the year's national champion.  A final poll was taken after completion of the 2017 NAIA Football National Championship.

Poll release dates
The poll released a spring edition of the rankings on April 10, 2017.  A complete schedule of poll release dates will be:

Week by week poll

Leading vote-getters
Since the inception of the Coaches' Poll in 1999, the #1 ranking in the various weekly polls has been held by only a select group of teams.  Through the last (postseason) poll of the 2017 season, the teams and the number of times they have held the #1 weekly ranking are shown below.  The number of times a team has been ranked #1 in the postseason poll (the national champion) is shown in parentheses.

There has been only one tie for the leading vote-getter in a weekly poll.  In 2015, Southern Oregon was tied with Marian (IN) in the preseason poll.

In 1999, the results of a postseason poll, if one was conducted, are not known.  Therefore, an additional poll has been presumed, and the #1 postseason ranking has been credited to the postseason tournament champion, the Northwestern Oklahoma State Rangers.

References

Rankings
NAIA football rankings